Nyanda Janelle Thorbourne, better known by her stage name/mononym Nyanda, is a Jamaican-American recording artist and songwriter from Kingston, Jamaica. Nyanda is a member of the R&B/reggae duo Brick & Lace whose debut album, Love Is Wicked, was released through Geffen / Kon Live in 2007 and featured the chart-topping single "Love Is Wicked".

In February 2013, Nyanda released her first promotional single, "Trouble", after announcing that she would be pursuing a solo career in music. Her first official single, "Slippery When Wet", was released in September 2013.

Early life

Nyanda Thorbourne was born to an African American mother and a Jamaican father in Kingston, Jamaica. She has 3 sisters, Tasha, Nailah and Candace Thorbourne. Nyanda went to Campion College High School during which time her group Brick & Lace was formed. After graduating High School Nyanda studied Marketing at Miami Dade College and then Advertising & Theater at the University of Miami. The name "Nyanda" is a Swahili word which means "plains".

Career

Brick and Lace (2006–2012)

Nyanda's career in music started as a member of the pop/reggae group Brick & Lace. In 2006 Akon signed the group to Konvict Muzik / Geffen Records and released their debut album, Love Is Wicked in 2007. The album spawned four charting singles – "Never Never", "Get That Clear", "Bad to di Bone" and their biggest hit, "Love Is Wicked", which was listed for 97 weeks in 7 different charts.

Solo career (2013–present)

February 2013 marked the launch of Nyanda's career as a solo artist with the release of her promotional single, "Trouble". Produced by Black Lion, "Trouble" is a remix of Taylor Swift's multi-platinum single "I Knew You Were Trouble" which fuses reggae, dancehall and pop music. "Trouble" entered UK Music Week's Top 30 Urban Club Charts in Week 7 (2013) and remained in the charts for 7 Weeks, peaking at No. 15.

Nyanda's first official single, "Slippery When Wet", was initially released as a free download through SoundCloud on 8 March 2013. "Slippery When Wet" entered UK Music Week's Urban Club Charts in Week 27 (2013) and remained in the Top 30 for 5 weeks, peaking at No. 13. It was licensed and officially released later in the year by Cloud 9 (Benelux), Magic Records (Poland & Bulgaria) and Tropic Electric / InGrooves (Rest of the World). "Slippery When Wet" Won the Award for Best Reggae Song at the 2014 Lipstick Radio's Indie Music Awards.

In August 2013, Nyanda released the electro fueled house track,  "Cool & Deadly" with South African DJs Euphonik and Fresh. "Cool & Deadly" was considered a South African Summer Anthem in 2013 as it climbed to No. 28 on South Africa Airplay Charts and reached No. 1 on 5FM's Top 40. The music video for "Cool & Deadly" was done documentary style, with all footage being taken from Split Seconds, a 5-part TV series on Channel O showcasing the fast-paced look at Fresh and Euphonik in Miami during 2013's Winter Music Conference.

Bloodline

In 2010, Nyanda and her sisters formed the songwriting team Bloodline. They have written songs for Kelly Rowland, Christina Aguilera, Nicole Scherzinger, Leah LaBelle and Arash. In 2012, she co-wrote the gold-certified, chart topping single "Follow the Leader" by Wisin & Yandel featuring Jennifer Lopez.

Philanthropy

Reach A Hand Uganda (RAHU)

In February 2014, Nyanda was appointed Goodwill Ambassador for Reach A Hand Uganda.

Discography

Singles

As lead artist

As featured artist

Non-singles

As lead artist

As featured artist

Songwriting credits

Music videos

References

External links
 

1978 births
Living people
Jamaican rappers
Jamaican people of English descent
Jamaican people of Jewish descent
Reggae fusion artists
Ragga musicians
Jamaican reggae singers
21st-century Jamaican women singers
Dancehall musicians
Musicians from Kingston, Jamaica
American women singer-songwriters
Singer-songwriters from Florida
21st-century American women singers
21st-century American singers